Île de la Possession, or Possession Island, formerly Île de la Prise de Possession, is part of the Subantarctic Crozet Archipelago. Administratively, it is part of the French Southern and Antarctic Lands. It is an important nesting site for seabirds.

Description
Île de la Possession lies in the eastern group of the archipelago, about 20 km west of Île de l'Est (East Island).  With an area of  it is the largest island of the group and the only inhabited one. It has a rugged landscape of mountains cut by deep glaciated valleys.  The coastal areas and valleys are covered with herbaceous subantarctic vegetation.  The island is uninhabited except for the staff of the Alfred Faure research station at the eastern end of the island, with a maximum of about 20 people.

Alfred Faure research station
Alfred Faure research station is a research Station made out of about 12 Main buildings. The Station has about 20 Personnel active at max. It is located on the far eastern point of Île de la Possession. The temperature reaches an average of 5.3°C (41.5°F). The name of the Base comes from Alfred Faure, the leader of the site in the 1960s. The base has a 1.6 KM long Road that connects the base to the sea through which, a vessel named Marion Dufresne visits sporadically to bring supplies. An aerial cableway also runs up from the coast to the station.

History
In 1840 the Ross expedition anchored near the island to bring provisions to a stranded group of eleven elephant-seal hunters.

Wildlife

Birds
The island has been identified as an Important Bird Area (IBA) by BirdLife International as a breeding site for seabirds, of which there are at least 26 breeding species.  Birds nesting in relatively large numbers include king, northern rockhopper and macaroni penguins, wandering, sooty and light-mantled albatrosses, northern giant petrels, medium-billed prions, Kerguelen and soft-plumaged petrels, and South Georgia diving petrels. Other island breeders in smaller numbers are southern giant petrels, grey-headed albatrosses and Kerguelen terns. Crozet blue-eyed shags, black-faced sheathbills and Eaton's pintails are resident. The smaller birds nest only at higher altitudes because of their vulnerability to rat predation at lower levels.

Other wildlife
The goats that were introduced have been eradicated, though black rats remain and are a threat to the birdlife.  Both Antarctic and subantarctic fur seals, as well as southern elephant seals, breed on the island.  A pod of about 80 killer whales inhabits the surrounding waters.  Two plants and 59 arthropod species endemic to the archipelago are present.

See also
 List of Antarctic islands north of 60° S

References

Important Bird Areas of the Crozet Islands
Volcanoes of the French Southern and Antarctic Lands
Possession
Seabird colonies
Penguin colonies